Jirud or Jirrud or Jir Rud may refer to:
 Jirud, Tehran
 Jayrud, a town in southern Syria